George Edgar Smollett Sievwright (born 10 September 1937) is a Scottish former footballer who played as a wing half Sievwright began his career with Dundee Junior club Broughty Athletic before going senior in the late 1950s with Dundee United. He played in seven league fixtures for United during the 1961–62 season and once during the following season.  After leaving Tannadice in 1963, Sievwright joined Oldham Athletic in a £500 deal. He made 37 appearances and scored 4 goals before moving on to Tranmere Rovers. Appearing only in Tranmere's reserve team, Sievwright spent a season with Rochdale, where supporters found about his release before he did. Subsequently, joining Macclesfield Town, Sievwright won the FA Trophy during his final playing years.

In November 1972, Sievwright moved into management, joining Mossley as player/manager. His time was brief, lasting little over a year before being dismissed in January 1974. He also had a spell managing Stalybridge Celtic.

Honours

Macclesfield Town
FA Trophy: 1
 1969–70

References

External links
 

1937 births
Footballers from Dundee
Living people
Scottish footballers
Scottish Football League players
English Football League players
Dundee United F.C. players
Oldham Athletic A.F.C. players
Tranmere Rovers F.C. players
Rochdale A.F.C. players
Macclesfield Town F.C. players
Mossley A.F.C. players
Mossley A.F.C. managers
Scottish football managers
Stalybridge Celtic F.C. managers
Association football wing halves
Broughty Athletic F.C. players
People from Broughty Ferry